Sport-Kompleksi Shatili is a multi-use stadium in Tbilisi, Georgia. It is used mostly for football matches and is the home stadium of FC Norchi Dinamoeli. The stadium is able to hold 2,000 people.

External links 
 Soccerway
 Stadium location on Google Map.

Sports venues in Tbilisi
Football venues in Tbilisi